William R. Landers was a state legislator in Mississippi. He represented Jefferson County, Mississippi in the Mississippi House of Representatives from 1872 to 1876.

In 1873 he was appointed an officer in the state militia. He opposed the privilege tax bill.

See also
African-American officeholders during and following the Reconstruction era

References

Members of the Mississippi House of Representatives
People from Jefferson County, Mississippi
Year of death missing
Military personnel from Mississippi
Year of birth missing
African-American state legislators in Mississippi
19th-century American politicians
African-American politicians during the Reconstruction Era